Darko Brljak (born 23 December 1984) is a Slovenian football goalkeeper.

Honours
Slovenian Championship: 2006–07, 2007–08
Slovenian Supercup: 2007

External links
NZS profile 

1984 births
Living people
Footballers from Ljubljana
Slovenian footballers
Association football goalkeepers
NK Dob players
NK Domžale players
ND Gorica players
NK Olimpija Ljubljana (2005) players
Slovenian expatriate footballers
Slovenian PrvaLiga players
Expatriate footballers in Hungary
Slovenian expatriate sportspeople in Hungary
Egri FC players
Flota Świnoujście players
Expatriate footballers in Poland
Slovenian expatriate sportspeople in Poland